Apollo Vredestein B.V. is a Netherlands-based tyre manufacturer. Since 2009, it is owned by Apollo Tyres Ltd of India. Apollo Vredestein has its head office in Amsterdam, Netherlands, and its production facility in Enschede. It designs, manufactures, and sells tyres under the Apollo and Vredestein brand names via offices in Europe and North America.

Vredestein products include car tyres, tyres for agricultural and industrial applications, and bicycle tyres. A significant number of its car tyres are designed by Italian design house Giugiaro Design. The brand is over 100 years old.

History

Emile Louis Constant Schiff became the owner of the Nederlandse Guttapercha Maatschappij in Delft, the forerunner of Apollo Vredestein, on 6 November 1908.

Vredestein, 1909–2009 
In 1909, the company moved to Loosduinen and changed its name to NV Rubberfabriek Vredestein. The name Vredestein comes from the name of the farm Schiff bought in Loosduinen in 1909 and where he first started making rubber. The company initially specialised in all kinds of rubber products, including shoe heels, tennis balls, floor coverings, boots, and indoor football balls.

On September 13, 1934, most of the factory in Loosduinen was lost in a fire. Reconstruction started immediately, and the bicycle tyre factory in Doetinchem was established in the same year. In 1946, the NV Nederlandsch-Amerikaansche Autobanden-fabriek Vredestein was founded in Enschede, with American company B.F. Goodrich owning just over 20% of the shares. A year later, Schiff laid the cornerstone of the plant in Enschede. 

The growth of the company accelerated in 1962 when it merged with N.V. Rubberfabrieken Hevea in Raalte. Under the influence of globalisation in the 1970s, the Vredestein brand increasingly came to focus on car, agricultural, industrial, and two-wheeler tyres. The oil crisis prompted many mergers in the tyre industry during these years. In 1971, the company became wholly owned by B.F. Goodrich. Soon after, Vredestein's products found their way to 125 different countries. In 1976, the Dutch state took over 49% of the shares in Vredestein, and 2% was obtained by the Stichting tot Voortzetting van Vredestein (Foundation for the Continuation of Vredestein). While the remaining 49% initially remained in the possession of B.F. Goodrich, the shares were later taken over by the Foundation for a symbolic sum. 

In the early 1990s, the company was acquired from the state by three Dutch investors. A collaboration was established with Italian designer Giorgetto Giugiaro in the late 1990s.

Apollo Vredestein, since 2009 
In 2009, Vredestein was acquired by India's Apollo Tyres Ltd, and the company name was changed to Apollo Vredestein B.V. In January 2013, Apollo Tyres Ltd announced the opening of its global R&D centre in Enschede, developing and testing car and van tyres for the company. On June 12, 2013, Apollo Tyres Ltd announced the acquisition of Cooper Tire & Rubber Company. In a US$2.5 billion deal. This would have turned Apollo Tyre into the world's seventh-largest tyre company, with combined global revenue of an estimated US$6.6 billion, according to Tire Review data, but on 30 December 2013, the Cooper acquisition was called off.

In May 2015, Apollo Tyres announced the relocation of its European head office from Enschede, to Amsterdam. The move happened in the following months. On March 5, 2020, the company announced that 750 jobs were to become redundant within 2 years. The intention is that the production of regular car tyres will be halted within that period.

Structure

Offices 
Apollo Vredestein B.V. is represent by:
 Netherlands: Apollo Vredestein B.V., Amsterdam 
 Netherlands: Apollo Vredestein Nederland B.V., Enschede 
 Germany: Apollo Vredestein GmbH, Vallendar
 Belgium: N.V. Apollo Vredestein BeLux S.A.,Bruxelles
 France: Apollo Vredestein France S.A. Paris 
 Austria: Apollo Vredestein Ges. m.b.H., Wenen  
 Switzerland: Apollo Vredestein Schweiz AG, Baden 
 Italy: Apollo Vredestein Italia S.R.L., Rimini  
 United Kingdom: Apollo Vredestein (UK) Ltd Kettering 
 Spain: Apollo Vredestein Iberica S.A. Cityparc. Edificio Bruselas. Barcelona  
 Sweden: Apollo Vredestein Däck AB, Hisings Backa (SW), Apollo Vredestein Norge A/S, Hisings Backa (NW) 
 United States: Apollo Vredestein Tire Inc., Atlanta, GA 
 Hungary: Apollo Vredestein Kft. Budapest  
 Poland: Apollo Vredestein Polska Sp. z o.o. Warszawa 
 Other countries: Apollo Vredestein Export, Enschede

Management
 Onkar S. Kanwar, chairman, Apollo Tyres Ltd
 Neeraj Kanwar, vice chairman and managing director, Apollo Tyres Ltd
 Benoit Rivallant, CEO, Apollo Vredestein B.V.

References

External links
 Vredestein website
 Apollo Tyres Ltd website

Tire manufacturers of the Netherlands
Cycle parts manufacturers
Dutch brands
Manufacturing companies established in 1909
2009 mergers and acquisitions
Dutch companies established in 1909
Manufacturing companies based in Amsterdam
Enschede